The use–mention distinction is a foundational concept of analytic philosophy, according to which it is necessary to make a distinction between  a word (or phrase) and  it. Many philosophical works have been "vitiated by a failure to distinguish use and mention". The distinction can sometimes be pedantic, especially in simple cases where it is obvious.

The distinction between use and mention can be illustrated with the word cheese:
 Use: Cheese is derived from milk.
 Mention: "Cheese" is derived from (the Anglian variant of) the Old English word ċēse.

The first sentence is a statement about the substance called "cheese": it uses the word "cheese" to refer to that substance. The second is a statement about the word "cheese" as a signifier: it mentions the word without using it to refer to anything other than itself. Note the quotation marks.

Grammar 

In written language, mentioned words or phrases often appear between single or double quotation marks (as in "The name 'Chicago' contains three vowels") or in italics (as in "When I say honey, I mean the sweet stuff that bees make"). In philosophy, single quotation marks are typically used, while in other fields (such as linguistics) italics are much more common. Style authorities such as Strunk and White insist that mentioned words or phrases must always be made visually distinct in this manner. On the other hand, used words or phrases (much more common than mentioned ones) do not bear any typographic markings. In spoken language, or in absence of the use of stylistic cues such as quotation marks or italics in written language, the audience must identify mentioned words or phrases through semantic, pragmatic, and prosodic cues.

If quotation marks are used, it is sometimes customary to distinguish between the quotation marks used for speech and those used for mentioned words, with double quotes in one place and single in the other:
 When Larry said, "That has three letters", he was referring to the word 'bee'.
 With reference to 'bumbershoot', Peter explained that "The term refers to an umbrella".

A few authorities recommend against using different types of quotation marks for speech and mentioned words and recommend one style of quotation mark to be used for both purposes.

In philosophy 
The general phenomenon of a term's having different references in different contexts was called suppositio (substitution) by medieval logicians. It describes how one has to substitute a term in a sentence based on its meaning—that is, based on the term's referent. In general, a term can be used in several ways. For nouns, they are the following:
 Properly with a concrete and real referent: "That is my pig" (assuming it exists). (personal supposition)
 Properly with a concrete but unreal referent: "Santa Claus's pig is very big." (also personal supposition)
 Properly with a generic referent: "Any pig breathes air." (simple supposition)
 Improperly by way of metaphor: "Your grandfather is a pig". (improper supposition)
 As a pure term: "'Pig''' has only three letters". (material supposition)

The last sentence contains a mention example.

The use–mention distinction is especially important in analytic philosophy. Failure to properly distinguish use from mention can produce false, misleading, or meaningless statements or category errors. For example, the following sentences correctly distinguish between use and mention:
 "Copper" contains six letters, and is not a metal.
 Copper is a metal, and contains no letters.

The first sentence, a mention example, is a statement about the word "copper" and not the chemical element. The word is composed of six letters, but not any kind of metal or other tangible thing. The second sentence, a use example, is a statement about the chemical element copper and not the word itself. The element is composed of 29 electrons and protons and a number of neutrons, but not any letters.

Stanisław Leśniewski was perhaps the first to make widespread use of this distinction and the fallacy that arises from overlooking it, seeing it all around in analytic philosophy of the time, for example in Russell and Whitehead's Principia Mathematica. At the logical level, a use–mention mistake occurs when two heterogeneous levels of meaning or context are confused inadvertently.

Donald Davidson told that in his student years, "quotation was usually introduced as a somewhat shady device, and the introduction was accompanied by a stern sermon on the sin of confusing the use and mention of expressions." He presented a class of sentences like

which both use the meaning of the quoted words to complete the sentence, and mention them as they are attributed to W. V. Quine, to argue against his teachers' hard distinction. He said that quotations could not be analyzed as simple expressions that mention their content by means of naming it or describing its parts, as sentences like the above would lose their exact, twofold meaning.

Self-referential statements mention themselves or their components, often producing logical paradoxes, such as Quine's paradox. A mathematical analogy of self-referential statements lies at the core of Gödel's incompleteness theorem (diagonal lemma). There are many examples of self-reference and use–mention distinction in the works of Douglas Hofstadter, who makes the distinction thus:

Although the standard notation for mentioning a term in philosophy and logic is to put the term in quotation marks, issues arise when the mention is itself of a mention. Notating using italics might require a potentially infinite number of typefaces, while putting quotation marks within quotation marks may lead to ambiguity.

Criticism
Some analytic philosophers have said the distinction "may seem rather pedantic".

In a 1977 response to analytic philosopher John Searle, Jacques Derrida mentioned the distinction as "rather laborious and problematical".

 See also 

 
 
 
 
 
 
 
 
 

 Notes 

 References 
 Derrida, Jacques (1977) Limited Inc abc ... in Limited Inc Michael Devitt, Kim Sterelny (1999) Language and reality: an introduction to the philosophy of language
 W.V. Quine (1940) Mathematical Logic, §4 Use versus mention, pp. 23–5
 Wheeler, Samuel (2005) Davidson as Derridean: Analytic Philosophy as Deconstruction in Cardozo Law Review Vol. 27–2 November 2005 Symposium: Derrida/America, The Present State of America's Europe

 Further reading 
 A. W. Moore (1986) How Significant Is the Use/Mention Distinction? in Analysis Vol. 46, No. 4 (Oct. 1986), pp. 173–179

 External links 
 "Robert And The Use-Mention Distinction", by William A. Wisdom, c. 2002
 "On the use of Quotation Marks", by Ralph E. Kenyon, Jr. PhD, 29 December 1992, Revised 21 October 1993, Published in Etc.: A Review of General Semantics'', Vol. 51 No 1, Spring 1994. (accessed: 26 August 2006).
 "The evolution of Confusion", talk by Daniel Dennett AAI 2009, 4 October 2009

Analytic philosophy
Concepts in the philosophy of language
Metalogic
Conceptual distinctions